Racing Lermeño Club de Fútbol is a Spanish football team based in Lerma, Burgos, in the autonomous community of Castile and León. Founded in 1969, it plays in Tercera División – Group 8, holding home games at Estadio Arlanza, with a capacity of 2,500 seats.

In 2012, the club decided to create a basketball team to compete in the Provincial League of Burgos.

Season to season

22 seasons in Tercera División

Notable players
 Pablo Infante
 Juan Luis Guirado

References

External links
Official website 
Futbolme team profile 
El Portal del Fútbol profile 

Football clubs in Castile and León
Association football clubs established in 1969
1969 establishments in Spain